Adriatic league may refer to:
Basketball ABA League, commonly known as the Adriatic League
Adriatic Water Polo League